Tu Shandong (born November 1961) is a Chinese engineer specializing in machinery and power engineering. He is an academician of the Chinese Academy of Engineering (CAE) and formerly served as vice-president of East China University of Science and Technology. He is an honorary professor at the University of Nottingham, a member of the International Federation for the Promotion of Mechanism and Machine Science (IFToMM) and the Chinese Mechanical Engineering Society (CMES).

Biography
Tu was born in November 1961 in Yongding District, Longyan, Fujian, while his ancestral home in Dabu County, Guangdong. His grandfather, Tu Yanfan (1885–1944), was a revolutionist and educator and a member of the Tongmenghui. Both his father Tu Xiangsheng and mother Zeng Chunying were teachers. He has two older brothers. After the resumption of National College Entrance Examination, he enrolled at Nanjing Tech University, where he received his master's degree and doctor's degree in 1985 and 1988, respectively. In 1989 he was a postdoctoral fellow at Southwest Jiaotong University under the supervision of  Sun Xunfang and Gao Qing. In 1990 he was hired as a guest scientist at KTH Royal Institute of Technology in Stockholm, Sweden. Beginning in 1993, he served in several posts at his alma mater Nanjing Tech University, including associate professor, full professor, and vice-president. He briefly served as a Brain Pool Scholar at Chung-Ang University in South Korea. He was recruited as a professor at East China University of Science and Technology in November 2011, becoming vice-president in June 2006.

Works

Honours and awards
 1990 the 2nd China Youth Science and Technology Award
 2002 National Science Fund for Distinguished Young Scholars 
 2006 "Chang Jiang Scholar" (or " Yangtze River Scholar")
 November 22, 2019 Member of the Chinese Academy of Engineering (CAE)

References

1961 births
Living people
People from Longyan
Engineers from Fujian
Nanjing University of Technology alumni
Academic staff of East China University of Science and Technology
Members of the Chinese Academy of Engineering